William the Kid may refer to:

the evil CEO in Spy Fox in "Dry Cereal"
An unofficial reference to Billy the Kid

See also
Billy the Kid (disambiguation)
William Kidd (disambiguation)